Rajko Rep (born 20 June 1990) is a Slovenian professional footballer who plays as a midfielder for I liga side Bruk-Bet Termalica Nieciecza.

Club career
Rep started his career at Mons Claudius from Rogatec and was then transferred to Celje youth sides, where he signed his first professional contract. For a short period of time he also played for MU Šentjur on loan. He was named a team captain during his time in Celje at the age of 19 and was the youngest captain in the history of the club.

In late August 2010 he signed a four-year contract with Maribor. In August 2011, he was loaned to Mura 05 until the end of the 2011–12 Slovenian PrvaLiga season.

International career
Rep played for Slovenia under-19 through qualifications for the 2009 UEFA European Under-19 Championship where he scored five out of six Slovenia goals in the final phase of qualifications, including a hat-trick against Russia. He also scored against the Netherlands and Belarus.

He made his debut for the senior team on 19 November 2019 in a Euro 2020 qualifier against Poland. He substituted Benjamin Verbič in the 86th minute.

Personal life
Rep was born in Rogatec and started to play football at a local club when he was six years old. He is a declared NK Maribor supporter as he started to support the team during 1999 when the club was playing in the group stages of the UEFA Champions League.

Career statistics

International 

Scores and results list Slovenia's goal tally first, score column indicates score after each Rep goal.

Honours

Club
Maribor
Slovenian PrvaLiga: 2010–11
Slovenian Supercup: 2012, 2013

Austria Klagenfurt
Regionalliga Mitte: 2014–15

LASK Linz
Erste Liga: 2016–17

References

External links
 
 Player profile at NZS 
 

1990 births
Living people
People from Rogatec
Slovenian footballers
Association football midfielders
Slovenian PrvaLiga players
2. Liga (Austria) players
Austrian Football Bundesliga players
Liga I players
NK Celje players
NK Maribor players
ND Mura 05 players
SK Austria Klagenfurt players
LASK players
TSV Hartberg players
Sepsi OSK Sfântu Gheorghe players
Bruk-Bet Termalica Nieciecza players
Slovenian expatriate footballers
Slovenian expatriate sportspeople in Austria
Expatriate footballers in Austria
Slovenian expatriate sportspeople in Romania
Expatriate footballers in Romania
Slovenian expatriate sportspeople in Poland
Expatriate footballers in Poland
Slovenia youth international footballers
Slovenia under-21 international footballers
Slovenia international footballers